Zdzisław Aleksander Raczyński (born October 18, 1959 in Werpol) is a Polish diplomat, journalist and novelist, currently serving as and officer in the Ministry of Foreign Affairs (MFA).

He was raised in Siemiatycze. He was educated at University of Warsaw, under the Faculty of Political Science, and graduated in Arab studies at Moscow State Institute of International Relations. From 1990 to 1996 he was the Polish Press Agency foreign correspondent in Moscow. From 1997 to 2000 he was an advisor to the head of the National Security Bureau. 

He joined the MFA in May 2001, where he was the director of Eastern Policy Department, then the deputy director of the Europe Department. From 2004 to 2007 he was the Polish ambassador to Tunisia, and from 2010 to 2014 the ambassador to Armenia. From October 2016 and 2021 he was also the leader of the Solidarity Polish trade union unit at the MFA.

As a journalist and novelist, Raczynski published several articles on Russia policy issues and the Arab world. In 2018, he published the novel Harib, about the Libyan Revolution. His 2021 novel Poppy Seeds on the Eyelids is about the Holocaust of a Jewish community in a small town in eastern Poland.

References 

1959 births
21st-century Polish novelists
Ambassadors of Poland to Armenia
Ambassadors of Poland to Tunisia
Living people
Moscow State Institute of International Relations alumni
People from Siemiatycze County
Polish reporters and correspondents
Solidarity (Polish trade union) activists